Alien Avengers is a 1996 American television film directed by Lev L. Spiro and starring George Wendt. It was part of the Roger Corman Presents series.

It was also known as Welcome to Planet Earth. The film led to a sequel, Alien Avengers II, the following year.

Cast

George Wendt
Shanna Reed
Christopher M. Brown

Alien Avengers II

Plot
Aliens become sheriffs of a small town.

References

External links

Alien Avengers at Letterbox DVD
Alien Avengers II at Letterbox DVD
Alien Avengers II at TCMDB

1996 television films
1996 films
1990s English-language films
Films produced by Roger Corman
American science fiction television films
Films directed by Lev L. Spiro
1990s American films